Jay F. Grinney (born March 20, 1951) is an American health care executive. He is the former president and chief executive officer of Birmingham, Alabama-based HealthSouth Corporation, now known as Encompass Health Corporation.

Biography

Early life
Jay F. Grinney was born on March 20, 1951, in Milwaukee, Wisconsin. He was raised in Racine, Wisconsin. He graduated from St. Olaf College in 1973. He earned MBA and MHA degrees from Washington University.

Career
In 1981, Grinney joined Methodist Health Care System on a fellowship. In 1985, Grinney became the senior vice president TMH Services.

In 1990, Grinney joined HCA. He served as the president of the Houston Division of Columbia Hospital Corporation until 1994, when Columbia announced a merger with Nashville, Tennessee-based Hospital Corporation of America. He then continued as the president of HCA's Eastern Group.

In 2004, he was chosen by HealthSouth Corporation to serve as its president and chief executive officer. He served on boards of directors of HealthSouth Corporation, Energen Corporation, Coca-Cola Bottling Company United, the Birmingham Business Alliance's executive committee and its chairman's circle, the Birmingham Civil Rights Institute, and the Public Affairs Research Council of Alabama. He currently serves as an Industry Advisor to KKR's private equity healthcare practice and is the chairman of the board of Global Medical Response.

Personal life
Grinney married his third wife, Melanie Parker Grinney in 2009. They reside in Mountain Brook, Alabama. Grinney has a son, Matthew, and two daughters, Naomi and Rachel, from his first marriage.

References

1951 births
Living people
American health care chief executives
Businesspeople from Alabama
Businesspeople from Racine, Wisconsin
People from Mountain Brook, Alabama